The 2007 Clipsal 500 was the first race of the 2007 V8 Supercar season. It was held on the weekend of 1 to 4 March around the inner streets of Adelaide, the capital of South Australia. The Adelaide 500 is a unique event where the round results are determined by the results from the 2nd race, rather that the driver with the most points from the weekend. This means, as was the case in the 2007 round, that the winner of the round doesn't necessarily lead the championship after the event.

Qualifying
The event was the first run under the new 2007 qualifying rules, in which the one-hour session is split into three 'knock out' parts. The first major eliminations occurred in the second part when Mark Skaife and defending champion Rick Kelly were eliminated. The front row of the grid for the first race was an all Ford row, with James Courtney from Stone Brothers Racing taking pole and Team Vodafone's Jamie Whincup taking second.

Race 1
Race 1 was held on Saturday 3 March 2007. The race began with Cameron McConville spinning at the Senna Chicane on the first lap after colliding with Andrew Jones. Team BOC also had problems with Brad Jones losing his front left wheel and brake assembly on lap 11.

John Bowe had a bad start to the year with his new team after running wide at the end of the main straight and clipping the tyre barrier. This destroyed the front right suspension on the car causing his retirement on lap 16.

On lap 48, Craig Lowndes was given a drive through penalty for contact with Max Wilson at turn 4. The remainder of the race was uneventful, with Todd Kelly winning the race from James Courtney and Jamie Whincup in third.

Race 2

Race 2 was run on Sunday 4 March. The race began with James Courtney having another bad start and dropping from 2nd to 10th after the first lap. Alan Gurr from Irwin Racing and Lee Holdsworth from Garry Rogers Motorsport collided at turn 5 on the first lap causing Gurr to retire from the race and Steve Owen from Autobarn Racing hit the concrete wall on the outside of turn 8 causing his retirement from the race. These incidents cause the first safety car of the weekend.

Following from the restart, Jack Perkins had engine problems, stalling at turn 11 and being hit by Paul Dumbrell causing his retirement and a penalty to Dumbrell which caused the second safety car on lap 8. After the pit lane opened for the compulsory stops, a collision occurred between Todd Kelly and Garth Tander causing Tander to be given a drive through penalty.

The remainder of the race was relatively incident free, with only minor collisions between drivers, until lap 64 when Jason Bargwanna stopped on the track with an electrical problem causing the safety car to be deployed for the third time. This bunched the field up, causing an 18 lap sprint to the finish with Todd Kelly leading from his brother Rick. On lap 68, Todd Kelly made a small mistake in turn 7 allowing Rick past and into the lead. This is how the race finished with Rick Kelly winning, from Todd Kelly and James Courtney in third.

Results

Qualifying

Race 1 results

Race 2 results

In-Car Camera Coverage
The six cars with in-car cameras at the first round were Mark Skaife, Craig Lowndes, James Courtney, Max Wilson, Cameron McConville and Rick Kelly. On Sunday Jason Bright also carried cameras.

Standings
After Round 1 of 13

References

External links
 Clipsal 500 website

Adelaide 500
Clipsal 500
2000s in Adelaide